Bishop Unified School District is a school district in Bishop, California. It was formed by the merger of two school districts:
Bishop Joint Union High School District, which operated
Bishop Union High School 
Palisade Glacier High School
Bishop Union Elementary School District, which operated 
Elm Street Elementary School 
Pine Street Elementary School
Home Street Middle Schools

References

External links

Bishop, California
School districts in Inyo County, California